"Faroeste Caboclo" (English: Caboclo Western) is a song composed by Renato Russo and recorded by Brazilian rock band Legião Urbana. Written in 1979, the song was released in 1987 in the album Que País É Este.

The song is a lengthy ballad, in the vein of Bob Dylan, that tells the story of João de Santo Cristo, a poor man from the Brazilian Northeast who moves to Brasília in search of a better life, gets involved in drug trafficking, briefly abandons the life of crime for the love of a woman and is finally murdered by a rival.

Despite its unusual characteristics for a folk song (168 different lines, no chorus and 9 minutes of playing time), "Faroeste Caboclo" was a smash hit. and under classic of brazilian music

It is widely regarded as a Brazilian rock classic. A film adaptation was released in 2013.

Plot 

The song starts with the introduction of João do Santo Cristo (meaning "Holy Christ" in Portuguese) and his twisted childhood in the countryside of Bahia. His father was murdered by a policeman. While growing up, he began flirting with a criminal lifestyle, stealing from the church's donation box, and seducing all the local girls; at age 15, he was sent to a correctional facility, where he started to think about the discrimination against people of his class and skin color.

João decides to search for a better life in Salvador. There, in a coffee shop, he has a chance meeting with a rancher who had bought a non-refundable bus ticket to the country's capital, Brasília, DF. Due to a change of plans, the rancher would be unable to use the ticket, so he gave the ticket to João.

Arriving, he was impressed by the beauty of the city's Christmas lights, and decided to get a job after the New Year's Eve. He started working as a carpenter in Taguatinga, and became a regular in parties around the city. In one of these parties, he meets his bastard cousin: a Peruvian man named Pablo who smuggled illicit merchandise from Bolivia.

João worked hard, but ultimately his wages were below subsistence level. Following Pablo's example, he started to plant and sell cannabis. Soon he took over the local market; but then he took to robbery, and screwed up his very first attempt. In prison, he was beaten and raped, which increased his anger towards the world and made him a dangerous, widely feared man. However, he soon met Maria Lúcia, a beautiful young girl who made him regret his criminal past. He declared his love to her, renounced his life of crime, and returned to carpentry.

One day, a very wealthy man arrived with a very shady job proposal, implied to be planting a bomb as an act of political terrorism (as Brazil was then under a military dictatorship). Disgusted, João said he won't protect powerful but cowardly men, and sent him off. Before leaving, angered, the man warned João that he had just thrown away his life. Distressed by this, João skipped work and went on a drinking binge, only to find out that he was replaced in his job. Without a better alternative, he turned to Pablo and became business partners with him: Pablo would bring drugs from Bolivia, and João would sell them in Planaltina.

João's activities then got the attention of Jeremias, a major local dealer known for throwing rock and drugs parties, who saw him as an intruder on his turf. Learning of this, João got from Pablo a Winchester .22 rifle, but decided to wait until Jeremias made the first move.

João's activities also kept him away from home for a long time. Homesick and missing Maria Lucia, he returns, only to find out that Jeremias had married her and got her pregnant. That was the last straw for João, who called Jeremias out for a duel the very next day at 2:00pm in Ceilândia, planning to kill both Jeremias and Maria Lúcia. Word of it somehow got out and even television broadcast the news about their duel.

At the place of the duel, crowded with people who had seen the news on TV, Jeremias shot João in the back. In a twist of fate, a repentant Maria Lucia brought João's Winchester .22. Calling Jeremias a coward for shooting him in the back, João shot him five times. Maria Lúcia dies in the gunfight, by João's side. The bourgeoisie watching the event on TV was astonished by what they had just watched, but the poorer people of the crowd called João a saint for facing death with bravery.

Film version

A movie based on the song was produced with screenplay by Marcos Bernstein, Victor Atherino and Paulo Lins. The film stars Fabrício Boliveira as João de Santo Cristo and Ísis Valverde as Maria Lúcia. Antônio Calloni, Marcos Paulo, Rodrigo Pandolfo and Felipe Abib also co-star in the film. Initially scheduled to a November 2012 release, it was postponed to May 2013.

References

External links
 English translation of the lyrics

1987 songs
Brazilian songs
Songs about Brazil
Portuguese-language songs
Legião Urbana songs
Songs written by Renato Russo